Quasar, Quasar, Burning Bright is a collection of seventeen scientific essays by American writer and scientist Isaac Asimov. It was the thirteenth of a series of books collecting essays from The Magazine of Fantasy and Science Fiction. These essays were first published between May 1976 and September 1977. It was first published by Doubleday & Company in 1978. Its title is derived from the first line of William Blake's 1794 poem "The Tyger".

Contents
"It's a Wonderful Town!" (May 1976)
"Surprise! Surprise!" (June 1976)
"Making It!" (July 1976)
"Moving Ahead" (August 1976)
"To the Top" (September 1976)
"Quasar, Quasar, Burning Bright" (October 1976)
"The Comet That Wasn't" (November 1976)
"The Sea-Green Planet" (December 1976)
"Discovery by Blink" (January 1977)
"Asimov's Corollary" (February 1977)
"The Magic Isle" (March 1977)
"The Dark Companion" (April 1977)
"Twinkle, Twinkle, Microwaves" (May 1977)
"The Final Collapse" (June 1977)
"Of Ice and Men" (July 1977)
"Oblique the Centric Globe" (August 1977)
"The Opposite Poles" (September 1977)

External links
Asimovonline.com

Essay collections by Isaac Asimov
1978 books
Works originally published in The Magazine of Fantasy & Science Fiction
Doubleday (publisher) books